James Hoyt (born 28 September 1990) is a Fijian footballer who plays as a winger for Manurewa.

Career

Hoyt started his career with New Zealand side Central United. In 2015, he signed for Ba in Fiji. Before the 2016 season, Hoyt signed for New Zealand second tier club Wairarapa United. In 2016, he signed for Tasman United in the New Zealand top flight. Before the 2018 season, Hoyt signed for New Zealand second tier team Manukau United. 

In 2018, he signed for Franklin United in the New Zealand fourth tier. Before the 2019 season, he signed for New Zealand third tier outfit Bucklands Beach. Before the 2021 season, Hoyt signed for Manurewa in the New Zealand second tier.

References

External links

 

Fijian footballers
Tasman United players
Living people
Ba F.C. players
Association football wingers
1990 births
Fiji international footballers
Central United F.C. players
Manurewa AFC players